John David "JD" Roberto (born October 23, 1969) is an American television personality, writer, host, and producer.

Biography
Born in White Plains, New York, Roberto went to the NYU's Tisch School of the Arts where he graduated with a Bachelor of Fine Arts degree in Acting. He also attended the [[University of British Columbia, where he received a Master of Fine Arts degree in Writing for Stage and Screen.

Television show hosting
Roberto is host of Battle of the Ages, a family-oriented game show airing on BYUtv. He is also currently the Executive Producer, writer, and host of Daily Burn 365, a live, daily fitness program for which he was nominated for a Daytime Emmy Award. Prior to DB365, Roberto was the host of Better, a syndicated morning talk show for which he was nominated for a Daytime Emmy Award as host of the show.

Roberto hosted the prime time reality TV shows How To Get The Guy and Are You Hot? (ABC), the relationship show Outback Jack (TBS), The Alaskan Adventure Challenge (Discovery Channel), the adventure travel show Shark Chasers (Travel Channel) American Idol Extra, the finale of The Search for the Next Elvira and Reality Remix (Fox Reality Channel). He has also been a recurring guest host of E! News Live.

His game show hosting credits include two seasons of Shop 'til You Drop from 2003 to 2005 (succeeding Pat Finn), You Lie Like a Dog, (Animal Planet), Food Fight (Food Network), Cut To The Chase (TBS) and the Florida State Lottery game show, Flamingo Fortune.

He is one of the hosts of The Price Is Right Live!, a live version of the long-running TV game show presented at the Bally's Casino in Las Vegas. He was a guest announcer on the actual show itself for its 39th season, which premiered September 20, 2010, shortly after previous announcer Rich Fields left the show. Roberto is also the announcer of Game Show Network's The Pyramid.

Since September 2015, Roberto has been the host of the online streaming fitness workout show DailyBurn 365 for which he was nominated for a Daytime Emmy Award in 2017.

Acting
As an actor, Roberto has appeared on All My Children (ABC), Passions (NBC), General Hospital (ABC), The New Adventures of Robin Hood (NBC) and the sitcoms Frasier(NBC), Family Matters (ABC) and Step by Step, (ABC). Film appearances include 'Til Night, Strippers, the short film Moment of Silence and Nautilus with Richard Norton

Stage credits in New York and Los Angeles include performances at Theatre for the New City, Soho Rep, PS 122 and the title role in of Steve Martin's Picasso at the Lapin Agile at the Laguna Playhouse.

Stunt performances
He was a stunt performer in such feature films as Flicka, Charlie's Angels, The Green Hornet, Galaxy Quest, The Mask of Zorro The Amazing Spider-Man, The Amazing Spider-Man 2 and in the web series The Bannen Way.

Roberto received a SAG Award nomination for Best Stunt Ensemble as part of the stunt team on The Amazing Spider-Man (2012 film).

Writer
Roberto is the author of The Hands On Dad blog and has written for The Huffington Post, The Bump, Parents Magazine, and LA Parent Magazine. Roberto's travel writing has been featured on the World Hum. He has been a contributing writer to the Los Angeles Times in the field of love and relationships. His writing has also appeared on the Imperfect Parent web site.  In 2011, Roberto's screenplay Heavy Water was named a Top 10 Finalist in the American Zoetrope Screenwriting Competition.

References

External links
 Official jdroberto.com website
 

1969 births
American game show hosts
American male soap opera actors
American travel writers
American male non-fiction writers
Game show announcers
Living people
People from White Plains, New York
Tisch School of the Arts alumni